Future Past is a 1987 Australian science-fiction film. It is one of the "Tomorrow's News" series of telemovies made in Australia in the late 1980s by CineFunds Limited, others including Outback Vampires, I've Come About the Suicide, Computer Ghosts, and Hard Knuckle.

Plot
Harlan is a computer whiz kid who works in a video store. He comes into contact with a group from the future, including his own self.

Cast
Nicholas Ryan  as Harlan 
Imogen Annesley as Simone 
John Ley as Billy 
Gary Down as B.L. Keye 
Paul Blackwell as Dave 
Cornelia Frances as Mother 
Doug Scroope as Father 
Cecily Polson as Dymphna 
Paula Duncan as Miss Bernsteen

References

External links

1987 television films
1987 films
Australian science fiction films
Films scored by Chris Neal (songwriter)
1980s English-language films
1980s Australian films